AC/DC are  an Australian hard rock band from Sydney. Formed in November 1973, the group originally consisted of vocalist Dave Evans, lead guitarist Angus Young, rhythm guitarist Malcolm Young (his older brother), bassist Larry Van Kriedt and drummer Colin Burgess. The band's current lineup features Angus Young, bassist Cliff Williams (from 1977 to 2016, and since 2018), vocalist Brian Johnson (from 1980 to 2016, and since 2018), drummer Phil Rudd (from 1975 to 1983, 1994 to 2015, and since 2018), and rhythm guitarist Stevie Young (nephew of Angus and Malcolm Young, a member since 2014).

History

1973–1994
AC/DC were a rock band formed in November 1973 by brothers Angus (lead guitar) and Malcolm Young (rhythm guitar), with the original lineup also including vocalist Dave Evans, bassist Larry Van Kriedt and drummer Colin Burgess. The band's first single "Can I Sit Next to You, Girl" was released after the departure of Van Kriedt, with a third Young brother, producer George, filling in on bass. AC/DC subsequently went through numerous early personnel changes, including replacing Dave Evans with Bon Scott in time for the recording of their debut Australian album High Voltage, which also featured contributions from George Young and session drummer Tony Currenti. By early 1975, the band had settled on a lineup of Angus and Malcolm Young, Bon Scott, bassist Mark Evans and drummer Phil Rudd.

Shortly after the release of Let There Be Rock in 1977, Evans was fired from AC/DC due to growing tensions with the Young brothers. He was replaced by English bassist Cliff Williams. After two more studio albums, Scott died on 19 February 1980 of acute alcohol poisoning. The band briefly considered breaking up, but later enlisted former Geordie frontman Brian Johnson as Scott's replacement. In 1983, following an altercation with Malcolm Young and ongoing problems with substance abuse, Rudd was fired from AC/DC. He was replaced by Simon Wright, who remained until 1989 before joining Dio. Wright was replaced by Welsh drummer Chris Slade for five years, before Rudd returned in late 1994 during sessions for the group's thirteenth studio album Ballbreaker. Rudd was later arrested and pleaded guilty to drug charges and threatening to kill a former assistant, with Slade returning to replace him on the Rock or Bust World Tour. In March 2016, several shows were cancelled after Johnson was ordered by doctors to cease touring due to "severe hearing problems". The following month, it was announced that Guns N' Roses frontman Axl Rose would replace Johnson as a temporary vocalist for the remaining tour dates. Long-term bassist Cliff Williams retired after the tour, with his last show taking place on 20 September 2016.

Following the conclusion of the Rock or Bust World Tour, it was reported that Angus Young, Stevie Young and Rose would continue AC/DC with new musicians once the Guns N' Roses Not in This Lifetime... Tour had concluded, with a new studio album planned. Malcolm and George Young both died in late 2017. In early 2019, reports began to circulate that Johnson, Williams and Rudd had returned to AC/DC to record a new album as a tribute to Malcolm Young, using archived guitar parts that the brothers had recorded earlier; the report also indicated that Johnson would perform live with the band to promote the new album. In September 2020, the rumours were confirmed as a new lineup comprising Angus and Stevie Young, Johnson, Williams and Rudd was announced.

Members

Current

Former

Others

Timeline

Lineups

Bibliography

References

External links
AC/DC official website

AC DC